In mathematics, the Cohen–Hewitt factorization theorem states that if  is a left module over a Banach algebra  with a left approximate unit , then an element  of  can be factorized as a product  (for some  and ) whenever .

References

Banach algebras
Theorems in functional analysis